Timor Tom or ‘’’Old Tom’’’ is a sperm whale from the 19th century, referenced in Herman Melville's Moby-Dick.

The only reference in the book is:

Ombay may reference the island of Pantar, across the Ombai Strait from Timor.

Dr. Lawrence Blair in his TV program Myths Magic and Monsters, suggests that Timor Tom was a gigantic albino sperm whale, who did not flee whalers, but attacked them and drowned many of them instead.

See also
List of individual cetaceans

References

Individual sperm whales
Moby-Dick
Maritime folklore